Duff Memorial Church is a former church building in Kirkmichael, Perth and Kinross, Scotland. It was built in 1890, replacing Kirkmichael Free Church of Scotland.

The church is named for Alexander Duff (1806–1878), Scotland's first missionary to India.

The last church service was held in 1955, two years before its closure.

References

External links
 Kirkmichael Free Church – ScottishArchitects.org.uk
 The church building from Balnald road – Google Street View, October 2008

 Alexander Duff website

Churches in Perth and Kinross
Duff Memorial
1890 establishments in Scotland
Former churches in Scotland